Pharmacis pyrenaicus is a moth of the family Hepialidae. It is known from France and Spain.

References

External links

Lepiforum.de

Moths described in 1838
Hepialidae
Moths of Europe
Taxa named by Hugues-Fleury Donzel